Dudoit is a surname. Notable people with this name include:
 Horace K. Dudoit, Hawaiian musician
 Jules Dudoit (1803–1866), French Ambassador to the Kingdom of Hawaii
 Mahealani Dudoit (1954–2002), Hawaiian poet
 Sandrine Dudoit, French-American statistician
 Xavier Dudoit (born 1975), French footballer

See also
 Alain Dudoit, Canadian Ambassador to Czechia and Slovakia and to Spain
 Axel Dudoit, French footballer for LB Châteauroux
 Bridget Lokelani Dudoit, member of Belgian-English rock band Esperanto